

Pre-season

Pre-season match results

Competitions

Overview

K League

K League Championship

FA Cup

League Cup

AFC Champions League

Group stage

Knockout stage

Match reports and match highlights
Fixtures and Results at FC Seoul Official Website

Season statistics

K League records

K League Championship records

All competitions records

Attendance records

 Season total attendance is K League Regular Season, League Cup, FA Cup, AFC Champions League in the aggregate and friendly match attendance is not included.
 K League season total attendance is K League Regular Season and League Cup in the aggregate.

Squad statistics

Goals

Assists

Coaching staff

Players

Team squad
All players registered for the 2009 season are listed.

(Out) 

(Out) 
(In) 

(In)

(Out)

(In)
(Discharged)

Out on loan & military service

 

 They were not registered 2009 season

 In : Transferred from other teams in the middle of season.
 Out : Transferred to other teams in the middle of season.
 Discharged : Transferred from Gwangju Sangmu and Police FC for military service in the middle of season. (Registered in 2009 season)
 Conscripted : Transferred to Gwangju Sangmu and Police FC for military service after end of season.

Transfers

In

Rookie Draft

Out

Loan & Military service

Tactics

Tactical analysis

Starting eleven and formation 
This section shows the most used players for each position considering a 4-4-2 formation.

Substitutes

See also
 FC Seoul

References

 FC Seoul 2009 Matchday Magazines

External links
 FC Seoul Official Website 

2009
Seoul